Nicolás Agustín Ferreyra (born 30 March 1993 in Río Cuarto (Córdoba), Argentina) is an Argentine professional footballer who plays as a centre-back

Clubs 
 Belgrano de Córdoba 2012–2018
 San Marcos de Arica 2015 (loan)
 Audax Italiano 2017 (loan)
 Rosario Central

References 
 
 

1993 births
Living people
Argentine footballers
Association football central defenders
Club Atlético Belgrano footballers
San Marcos de Arica footballers
Audax Italiano footballers
Rosario Central footballers
Chilean Primera División players
Argentine Primera División players
Argentine expatriate footballers
Argentine expatriate sportspeople in Chile
Expatriate footballers in Chile
People from Río Cuarto, Córdoba
Sportspeople from Córdoba Province, Argentina
21st-century Argentine people